Zoltán Finta (born 17 September 1979) is a Hungarian football player who currently plays for Pécsi Mecsek FC.

He has played for Kaposvár and Pécsi Mecsek in the Nemzeti Bajnokság I.

References

1979 births
Living people
People from Kaposvár
Hungarian footballers
Association football defenders
Pécsi MFC players
Sportspeople from Somogy County